The 2019 Meeting de Paris was the 25th edition of the annual outdoor track and field meeting in Paris, France. Held on 24 August 2019 at the Stade Sébastien Charléty, it was the twelfth leg of the 2019 IAAF Diamond League – the highest level international track and field circuit. This was the first time the meeting was held on the stadium's renovated blue running track. 

Despite no world-leading performances, three meeting records were set at the competition, all in the men's section. Further to this, two national records were improved during the competition. These performances by Musagala and Newman were their first career wins on the Diamond League.

Results

Men

Women

References

Results
Results Meeting de Paris 2019. Sport Result. Retrieved 2019-08-26.

External links
Official Diamond League Meeting de Paris website

2019
Paris
Meeting de Paris
Meeting de Paris
Meeting de Paris